Mukthagara Adhikari Muidayanse Ralahaminalage Vishaka Siriwardana (28 August 1956 – 23 October 2021), popularly known as Vishaka Siriwardana, was an actress in Sri Lankan cinema and television. In a career spanning more than three decades, she was known for her breakthrough roles in Saaranga, Sasara Chethana and Sura Duthiyo. At 5 feet 9 inches tall, she was the tallest actress in Sri Lanka.

Personal life
Vishaka Siriwardana was born on 28 August 1956 in Katupotha, Kurunegala, Sri Lanka as the eighth child in a family of nine siblings. Her mother was Donna Lizzie Siriwardena and father was Desai Sarath Siriwardena. She was educated at Katupotha Tissa Maha Vidyalaya.

She was married to Daya Dharmasiriwardena. Daya was involved with a terrible road accident and as a result, he had to have one of his legs amputated.

She was being treated for a cancerous condition for long time, but continued to work in the industry. However, she died on 23 October 2021 at the age of 66, while receiving treatment at the Kurunegala Teaching Hospital. Her remains were laid to rest at the Kurunegala Municipal Council Florist Hall from 8.00 am to 5.00 pm on 24 October 2021. Funeral function was performed on 25 October 2021 at Katupotha Cemetery.

Career
She entered drama by accident. One day, Vishaka heard that the film Wasanthaye Dawasak was being shot in her hometown of Katupotha, Kurunegala. She went there with a group of her friends and saw the cast of the film including queen actress Malini Fonseka. After seeing the shooting, she also wanted to be an actress. Film director Siri Kularatne's brother was a classmate of Visakha, whereby he helped Vishaka to meet Siri Kularatne. Then Kularatne selected Visakha for his latest film Anuradha and she made her film debut along with Malini Fonseka which was shot in 1981. But her first screened film is Saaranga in 1981 directed by Gamini Hewawitharana.

After the success of the film, she starred in the films, such as, Sanasanna Maa, and Yahalu Yeheli, both in 1982. In 1984, she acted in three films: Kokila, Podi Ralahami and Sasara Chethana. Later Visakha won the Sarasaviya Award for Best Emerging Actress for her performance in the film Sasara Chethana in 1985 at the 13th Sarasaviya Awards. She continued to receive invitations to films, but due to her husband's accident, she could not contribute to them. After that transition period, she returned to cinema with the film Sandamadala directed by Malani Fonseka. In 1986, she won the Best Performance Award at the 13th OCIC Award Ceremony for her role in Sura Duthiyo. Then she acted in the films such as, Puthuni Mata Samavenna, Sura Duthiyo, Asipatha Mamai, Sathyagrahanaya, Kristhu Charithaya, Cheriyo Doctor, Yasoma and Bheeshanaye Athuru Kathawak. 

Apart from cinema, she made notable appearances in the television particularly through villain roles. She played the character "Rathu Akka" in the television serial Isuru Gira, where she became very popular with that character at the time. Then she was able to contribute to a number of serials and soap operas such as; Bimmal Illama, Tulā Dahara, Sarala Samanalī, Kithsirigē Iraṇama, Deveni Vēdikāva, Sāvil Pālik, Kāhala Nādaya, Sivdiya Dahara, Poda Væssa, Bamba Ketu Hati, Bhawana, and Vasuda. In 2007, she won the Sumathi Best Teledrama Supporting Actress Award for her role in the television serial Doovili Sulanga at the 12th Sumathi Awards.

Filmography

Notes

See also 
 List of Sri Lankan actors

References

External links 
 

1956 births
2021 deaths
Sinhalese actresses
Sri Lankan film actresses
Sri Lankan television actresses
20th-century Sri Lankan actresses
21st-century Sri Lankan actresses
People from Kurunegala